"I Don't Want to Spoil the Party" is a song by the English rock band the Beatles, written by John Lennon and credited to Lennon–McCartney. It was released on the album Beatles for Sale in the United Kingdom in December 1964. "I Don't Want to Spoil the Party" was also released on the Beatles for Sale (No. 2) EP.

In the United States, Capitol released the song as the B-side of the single "Eight Days a Week", and later on the Beatles VI album, both in 1965. The song charted as a B-side, reaching number 39 on the Billboard Hot 100.

Lyrics
The lyrics anticipate themes that were to become familiar in Lennon's songwriting – alienation and inner pain. In this song, the narrator is at a party, waiting for his girl to show up. When it becomes clear that she has stood him up, he decides to leave, rather than spoil the party for everyone else. Both the lyrics and melody share a melancholy sound and theme with songs that precede it on Beatles for Sale, such as "No Reply" and "I'm a Loser". Author Ian MacDonald views the song as a return to the subject matter introduced by Lennon on "I'll Cry Instead", from the Beatles' A Hard Day's Night album, and a "preview" of "You've Got to Hide Your Love Away", from Help!

Recording
The Beatles recorded "I Don't Want to Spoil the Party" on 29 September 1964 in 19 takes, the last of which was released. George Harrison's guitar solo, played on his new Gretsch Tennessean in the style of Carl Perkins, was enhanced by midrange resonance boost, giving it an especially bright sound. According to The Encyclopedia of Country Music, the song is an early example of country rock, anticipating the Byrds' work in that style. MacDonald describes it as the "most overt" country track on Beatles for Sale, an album that is "dominated by the idiom".

Among the band's biographers, opinions differ on which Beatle sings the low harmony part during the verses, below Lennon's lead vocal. MacDonald lists Harrison as the second vocalist on the track, while John Winn credits McCartney, saying that he sounds "deceptively like a second Lennon". According to musicologist Walter Everett, the harmony part is Lennon "self-duetting".

Reception
Cash Box described it as "a funky, country-bluesish teen-angled tear-jerker."

Personnel
According to Walter Everett: except where noted
John Lennon – lead vocals (verses) and harmony vocals (chorus), acoustic rhythm guitar
Paul McCartney – bass, harmony vocals (chorus)
George Harrison – lead guitar, backing vocals
Ringo Starr – drums, tambourine

Chart positions

Rosanne Cash version

Rosanne Cash covered the song for her Hits 1979-1989 compilation. Her version went to number one on Billboard's Hot Country Songs chart in 1989. It was also Cash's last number one hit to date, and is the only Lennon-McCartney song to top the country chart.

Chart positions

Year-end charts

Notes

References

External links
 

Songs about parties
The Beatles songs
Song recordings produced by George Martin
Rosanne Cash songs
Songs written by Lennon–McCartney
Capitol Records singles
1964 songs
1965 singles
1989 singles
Songs published by Northern Songs
Columbia Records singles
Song recordings produced by Rodney Crowell
Country rock songs